LaFee is the debut album recorded by German pop rock singer LaFee.

Track listing 
All songs written by Bob Arnz and Gerd Zimmermann.
 "Prinzesschen" – 4:18
 "Virus" – 3:56
 "Mitternacht" – 4:45
 "Wo bist du (Mama)" – 4:41
 "Verboten" – 3:47
 "Halt mich" – 3:36
 "Das erste Mal" – 3:18
 "Du lebst" – 4:24
 "Was ist das" – 3:55
 "Lass mich frei" – 3:27
 "Sterben für dich" – 2:58
 "Wo bist du (Heavy Mix)" – 3:39

Special edition 
 "Warum" – 3:39

Special edition bonus DVD

"Virus" (Karaoke Video) – 4:00
"Prinzesschen" (Karaoke Video) – 3:50
Making of "Virus"
Photo gallery

Bravo edition 
The "Bravo" edition does not include the track "Wo bist du (Heavy Mix)".
 "Virus (Piano Version)" – 3:53
 "Sterben für dich (Piano Version)" – 3:01
 "Lass mich frei (Piano Version)" – 2:54
 "Das erste Mal (Piano Version)" – 3:07
 "Mitternacht (Piano Version)" – 3:01
 "Warum" – 3:35

Bravo edition enhanced content
 "Virus" (Music Video)
 "Prinzesschen" (Music Video)
 "Was ist das" (Music Video: Online Version)
 "Mitternacht" (Music Video: Director's Cut Version)
 Photo gallery

Charts

Year-end

References

External links 
Official LaFee website

2006 debut albums
LaFee albums
German-language albums